The Black River and Western Railroad  is a freight and heritage railroad operating in Hunterdon County, New Jersey, between Flemington, Lambertville and Ringoes. The railroad operates vintage steam and diesel powered locomotives.

History
The Black River & Western Railroad (BR&W) was started by William Whitehead in Oldwick, New Jersey, in the late 1950s. A portion of the defunct
Rockaway Valley Railroad went through his back yard. He and his sons started collecting rolling stock and an engine (Lackawanna #565). They started laying tracks but then the expansion of I-78 halted their dream of building a railroad at that location. They moved their equipment to the Chester Hill Branch of the Central Railroad of New Jersey (CNJ) with the hope of starting a railroad there.

BR&W was officially incorporated in 1961. The railroad's name is derived from the Black River, a river in Chester, and the direction that the river flows. Following a brief stint of operations on CNJ's Chester Hill Branch, equipment was moved to Flemington, New Jersey in 1963 and the search for a place to start their tourist train was continued. A leasing arrangement was created with the Pennsylvania Railroad (PRR) that allowed a tourist train to operate from Flemington to Lambertville on the original Belvidere-Delaware Railroad (PRR Belvidere Division) Flemington Branch (originally the Flemington Railroad & Transportation Company) in 1964. BR&W paid $5,000 a year and rehabilitated the railroad (PRR operated freight service on the line during this period). Steam engine #60 pulled the first trip out of Flemington on May 16, 1965. Weekend and holiday schedules were devised.

BR&W assumed ownership and operations of the Flemington Branch from the CNJ connection in Flemington to Flemington Branch Junction in Lambertville on March 16, 1970, purchasing it from PRR successor Penn Central (PC). With the acquisition of the rail line and its freight operations, on top of the existing tourist passenger service, a true shortline railroad was born. Base operations were established in Ringoes, New Jersey, and remain so today. Freight interchange after the 1970 purchase was made with PC at Lambertville and CNJ in Flemington. PC filed for bankruptcy that June.

PC continued to operate freight under bankruptcy protection until April 1, 1976 when Conrail (CR) assumed operations (the last PC freight train to operate on the Belvidere Division was on March 31, 1976). BR&W then purchased three miles of trackage in the Lambertville area that was part of the Belvidere Division mainline on March 31, 1976 before Conrail took over. BR&W also purchased the Flemington-Three Bridges portion from the bankrupt CNJ. Although coal, iron ore and general freights were rerouted to other lines such as the North Penn Branch, CR continued operating smaller interchange freight trains to Lambertville. In March 1977, a new interchange was built at Three Bridges, New Jersey with the former Lehigh Valley Railroad (LV) mainline.

Freight service to Lambertville ended by 1995 with tourist operations ceasing by the end of 1998, when the Federal Railroad Administration (FRA) prohibited operations due to poor track conditions. There was talk in 1999 of Trap Rock Industries quarry using the stub-ended section north of Lambertville for unit stone trains, resulting in a frenzy of track repairs taking place on the Ringoes-Lambertville segment to accommodate the anticipated traffic. The quarry ultimately backed out with the final work train operating in June 2002 to retrieve all remaining rolling stock.

Black River Railroad Historic Trust formed
In 2001, a separate non-profit entity known as the Black River Railroad Historic Trust (BRRHT), was formed to take over the tourist trains on the line. BRRHT does not own most of the passenger cars and until 2011, fees had to be paid to the BR&W for their use. BRRHT owns one diesel locomotive switcher, an SW9 numbered 438. It currently leases some coaches from the railroad and has use of several locomotives.

In 2014 the BRRHT started to clear the line between Ringos and Lambertville for passenger trains. In 2016 the first passenger train went down the first mile of the newly restored line in almost 20 years. In 2017 the BRRHT restored the first 2.5 miles of the line which is where Bowne Road Station is and Black River have been doing special events. In 2019 the BRRHT opened a further 1 mile towards Mount Airy Road. The BRRHT is looking to get into Lambertville within the next several years.

Recent history
In 2014, BRRHT announced that it was looking to reinstate service along the dormant Ringoes-Lambertville section now called the Alexauken Division.  In May 2017, the first two and a half miles was re-introduced to passenger service. The in-service track currently reaches Bowne Station, just over 4 miles north of Lambertville. Bowne Station includes a picnic grove co-constructed with Woodsedge Farm and the railroad. Special picnic and farm trains are scheduled year for this new portion of the line, along with an evening departure from Ringoes every Saturday and Sunday that special events do not operate.

Stations

Roster
The Black River & Western's fleet of locomotives are divided up into two categories: Locomotives used on the Flemington Branch, and locomotives used by the Black River Railroad System (a primarily freight but also leasing company).
Equipment in italics is owned by the BRRHT.

Black River & Western Locomotives — engines that are on the Flemington branch almost all the time

Black River Railroad Locomotives — engines that come and go on the Flemington Branch

In Service Passenger Equipment

Out of Service Passenger Equipment

Engines on Display

Passenger Equipment on Display

Freight Equipment

In Service Cabooses

Out of Service Cabooses

Cabooses on Display

Former equipment

Former Locomotives

Former Leased and Other Locomotives

Former Passenger Equipment

Former Rolling Stock

Former Cabooses

References

Further reading

New Jersey railroads
Railway companies established in 1961
Heritage railroads in New Jersey
Spin-offs of the Pennsylvania Railroad
Flemington, New Jersey
East Amwell Township, New Jersey